Tomakin may refer to:

Tomakin, New South Wales
Tomakin, a character in Aldous Huxley's novel Brave New World